Bu Jiang (不降) was the eleventh king of the semi-legendary Xia Dynasty. He ruled for 59 years.

Family 
Bu Jiang was a son of Xie of Xia and his consort and thus a grandson of Mang of Xia and brother of Jiong of Xia.

His consort is unknown, and it is possible that he had concubines. His son was Kong Jia and his nephew was Jin of Xia.

Biography 
Bu Jiang is widely regarded as one of the wisest Emperors of Xia.

According to Bamboo Annals, on the 6th year of his regime, he fought with Jiuyuan(九苑)
.

In the 35th year of his reign, his vassal state of Shang defeated Pi (皮氏).

In the 59th year of his regime he passed his throne to his younger brother Jiong. 10 years later, Bu Jiang died.

Sources 

Xia dynasty kings